Adrián René Granados (born August 14, 1989) is an American professional boxer.

Amateur career
Granados had an amateur record of 75-12. He won the 2008 Junior Olympic State and Regional Championship. That same year, he ranked 5th in the national rankings at junior welterweight. In 2009, he took both the Junior Golden Gloves National Championships and then won the bronze medal at the Ringside World Championships. Granados was also on the Mexican Olympic Team as a reserve.

Professional career

Granados vs. Titsworth 
On September 17, 2011, Granados beat veteran Trenton Titsworth at the UIC Pavilion in Chicago, Illinois.

Granados vs. Diaz 
On November 21, 2014, Granados lost a majority decision to Félix Díaz for the WBC Central American Boxing Federation title.

Granados vs. Solomon 
In his next bout, Granados fought on the undercard of Floyd Mayweather Jr. vs. Manny Pacquiao on May 2, 2015, where he lost to Brad Solomon by split decision.

Granados vs. Broner 
His fifth defeat came against his good friend, former four-division world champion Adrien Broner on February 18, 2017. Granados suffered the third split decision loss of his professional career; a scorecard of 97-93 to Granados was overruled by scores of 97-93 and 96-94 in favor of Broner. Broner praised his opponent after the fight, saying "Adrian Granados is a world-class fighter. A lot of guys duck him, but I wanted to fight him because that's what I'm about."

Granados vs. Porter 
His sixth loss came in his next fight, against former IBF welterweight champion Shawn Porter on November 4, 2017. Granados suffered his first unanimous decision loss, with all three judges scoring the bout 117-111 to Porter.

Granados vs. Garcia 
Granados also suffered back-to-back losses in 2019 in his 30th and 31st fights, against former two-division champion Danny García, and former IBF lightweight champion Robert Easter Jr. Garcia was ranked as the #1 welterweight by the WBC at the time. García was the first opponent to stop Granados, who lost by seventh-round technical knockout.

Granados vs. Easter Jr 
Easter Jr. defeated him by ten-round unanimous decision, with scores of 97-93, 98-92, and 100-90 in favor of Easter Jr. The scorecard of 100-90 meant that one judge did not have Granados winning a single round, which attracted controversy and criticism. In his post-fight interview, Granados was exasperated, saying "Honestly, I’m speechless. I felt like I won the fight... It seemed like they already had a victor. That 100-90? Come on now.”

Granados vs. Sanchez 
On May 1, 2021, Granados battled to a majority draw, the third draw of his career, against José Luis Sánchez on the undercard of Andy Ruiz Jr. vs. Chris Arreola.

Granados vs. Benn 
On June 14, 2021, it was announced that Granados would be facing undefeated Conor Benn on July 31, 2021 as part of Fight Camp in Brentwood, England. However, the fight was postponed after Benn tested positive for COVID-19. On August 14, 2021, it was announced that the fight would take place on September 4 at Emerald Headingley Stadium in Leeds, England on the undercard of Mauricio Lara vs. Josh Warrington II. Benn was ranked #11 by the WBC, #12 by the WBA and #13 by the IBF at the time. On the night, Benn outworked and outboxed his opponent over the ten-round distance to earn a unanimous decision, with scores of 100-90, 99-91 and 97-93 in his favour. Granados had seemingly been content to just stay in the fight and make no real attempt at winning, and by the final round had become so passive that Benn shouted at him, dropping his hands and banging his legs in an invitation for Granados to stand and fight.

Professional boxing record

References

External links

Adrian Granados - Profile, News Archive & Current Rankings at Box.Live

American boxers of Mexican descent
People from Berwyn, Illinois
Light-welterweight boxers
1989 births
Living people
American male boxers
Boxers from Illinois